Yekanabad (also Romanized as Yekanābād; also known as Yeganābād, Yegnābād, and Yengābād) is a village in Alvandkuh-e Gharbi Rural District, in the Central District of Hamadan County, Hamadan Province, Iran. At the 2006 census, its population was 2,824, in 691 families.

References 

Populated places in Hamadan County